Gostyniec is a village in the administrative district of Gmina Świerzno, within Kamień County, West Pomeranian Voivodeship, in north-western Poland.

The village has a population of 165.

References

Gostyniec